Texas Township is an inactive township in Dent County, in the U.S. state of Missouri.

Texas Township was erected in 1866, taking its name from nearby Texas County, Missouri.

References

Townships in Missouri
Townships in Dent County, Missouri